Events from the year 1877 in Denmark.

Incumbents
 Monarch – Christian IX
 Prime minister – J. B. S. Estrup

Events
 
 7 January – The weekly Illustreret Familie Journal, now Familie Journalen, is published for the first time.
 15 February – St. Paul's Church in Copenhagen is completed and opens for the first time.
 18 February –  St. Paul's Church in Copenhagen is inaugurated.
 12 April – The Estrup government's adoption of a temporary national budget after dissolving Rigsdagen sets off the political struggle between Landstinget and Folketinget known as provisorietiden, "the provisional era". The opposition introduces their so-called visnepolitik, "whithering politics".
 12 August – Six houses are washed away when Lønstrup is hit by a thunderstorm and torrential rain.
 1 December – The Aarhus–Ryomgård section of the Grenaa Line railway is opened.

Date unknown
 Aarsdale Windmill is completed.
 Nielsine Nielsen and Johanne Gleerup are admitted to the University of Copenhagen as Denmark's first female university students.

Births

January–June
 2 January – Johannes Schmidt, biologist credited with the 1920 discovery that eels migrate to the Sargasso Sea to spawn (died 1933)
 12 February – Holger Scheuermann, surgeon after whom Scheuermann's disease is named (died 1960)
 20 February – Albert Kongsbak, painter (died 1958)
 28 February – Peder Møller, violinist and music teacher (died 1940)
 7 March – Thorvald Ellegaard, track racing cyclist (died 1954)
 15 March – Axel Frische, screenwriter, actor and film director (died 1956)
 22 March – Einar Ambt, architect (died 1928)
 11 April – Carl Alstrup, actor and film director (died 1943)
 28 April – Frederik Draiby, architect, first city designer of Aarhus (died 1966)
 29 May – Jens Hajslund, Olympic sport shooter, bronze medalist in team free rifle at the 1912 Summer Olympics (died 1964)
 8 June – Thorvald Aagaard, composer (died 1937)
 27 June – Axel Høeg-Hansen, architect (died 1947)

July–December
 1 July – Kay Schrøder, Olympic fencer, competitor at the 1920 Summer Olympics (died 1949)
 13 July – Erik Scavenius, politician, Prime Minister of Denmark 1942–1943 (died 1962)
 10 August – Harald Bergstedt, writer, novelist, playwright and poet (died 1965)
 22 August – Henning Eiler Petersen, mycologist, botanist and marine botanist (died 1946)
 2 December – Carl Manicus-Hansen, gymnast, silver medalist in the team event in gymnastics at the 1906 Intercalated Games (died 1960)

Deaths
 30 January – Rudolph Rothe, landscape architect (born 1802)
 28 March – Henrik Nicolai Clausen, theologian and National Liberal Party politician (born in 1793)
 25 April – Peter Faber, songwriter, telegraphy pioneer (born 1810)
 16 November – Oscar Alexander Ræder, writer (born 1844)

References

 
1870s in Denmark
Denmark
Years of the 19th century in Denmark